Acalyptris maritima is a moth of the family Nepticulidae. It is found along the coasts of Adriatic, Ionian and Aegean Seas, where it has been recorded from Croatia, Greece and Italy.

The wingspan is 4.5-5.5 mm.

The larvae feed on Limonium vulgare. They mine the leaves of their host plant. The mine consists of a full-depth gallery, starting much contorted, often spirally, later becoming a full-depth mine with narrow broken, brown frass, running more-or-less straight through the leaf. The larval exit hole is located on the upperside of the leaf. The cocoon is white and usually spun on the underside of the leaf.

External links
Acalyptris Meyrick: revision of the platani and staticis groups in Europe and the Mediterranean (Lepidoptera: Nepticulidae)

Nepticulidae
Moths of Europe
Moths described in 1997